The Second Constituent Assembly of Nepal, later converted to the Legislature Parliament, was a unicameral legislature of Nepal. It was elected in the 2013 Constituent Assembly elections after the failure of the first Constituent Assembly to promulgate a new constitution. The Assembly converted into a legislative parliament after the constitution was promulgated in 2015. The legislature parliament's term ended on 14 October 2017.

Opening
Former Prime Minister Surya Bahadur Thapa, the oldest member of the house, assumed chairmanship of the CA on January 20, 2014 and administered the oath of office to 565 lawmakers at the first meeting of the assembly on January 21, 2014. Leaders of the NC, CPN-UML and UCPN (Maoist) pledged to draft a new constitution within a year. More than 80% of the members were new faces.

Power-sharing discussions

On January 26, 2014, President Ram Baran Yadav called for the election of a Prime Minister and the formation of a consensus government within a week  as per article 38(1) of the constitution which provided for the formation of government through political understanding. The Nepali Congress obtained the support of the CPN-UML for a NC-led consensus government and the two parties also agreed to hold local body elections within six months and adopt a new constitution within a year. An all-party meeting followed at which the CPN-UML, UCPN (Maoist) and MPRF-Loktantrik expressed support for a government under Sushil Koirala. The RPP-N boycotted the meeting. Further discussions were held between the NC, CPN-UML and UCPN (Maoist) at which the Maoists expressed support for the idea of a NC-led government but did not agree to join the government and decided to stay in opposition. On February 2, 2014, the NC  abandoned its pursuit of a consensus government under article 38(1) of the constitution after the UCPN (Maoist) and RPP-N, the third and fourth largest parties, decided not to join the government. The party then initiated talks with the  CPN-UML to form a majority government under article 38(2) of the constitution.

Composition

A total  of thirty political parties and two independents were represented at the start of the second constituent assembly. However, some parties later merged and the number of parties declined.

Committees
The following parliamentary committees were formed:
 State Affairs Committee
 Public Accounts Committee
 Environment Protection Committee
 International Relations and Labour Committee
 Legislation Committee
 Good Governance and Monitoring Committee
 Industry Commerce and Consumer Welfare Committee
 Women, Children, Senior Citizen and Social Welfare Committee
 Development Committee
 Agriculture and Water Resources Committee
 Finance Committee
 Parliamentary Hearing Special Committee

See also 

 List of members elected in the 2013 Nepalese Constituent Assembly election

References

Unicameral legislatures
Constitutional law
2013 in Nepal
History of Nepal (2008–present)
Parliament of Nepal
Constituent Assembly of Nepal